The Chief of General Staff (CEMGFAA) of the Angolan Armed Forces is the highest-ranking military officer in the Angolan military and is responsible for maintaining control over the three service branches of the military.

List of chiefs

People's Armed Forces of Liberation of Angola (1975–1992)

Angolan Armed Forces (1992–present)

References 

Military of Angola
Chiefs of defence